Double crown can refer to:
 the Pschent combined crown of Ancient Egypt;
 a British coin worth ten shillings or two crowns;
 winning the first two of the three races in the Triple Crown of Thoroughbred Racing
 a double hair whorl